Europahalle is an indoor sporting arena located in Karlsruhe, Germany.

The capacity of the arena is 9,000 people.

The venue has featured a number of world record performances in athletics, including a jump of 2.07 m in the high jump by Heike Henkel in 1992, when the Europahalle hosted the German Indoor Championships. This mark remained unbettered indoors for fourteen years and remains one of the best ever performances in the discipline.

Events
Sports

 European Juggling Convention August 2–10, 2008
 EuroBasket 1985
 EuroBasket 1993
 All-Star Days 1990-1995 of the Basketball Bundesliga
 EuroBasket Women 1998
 Games of the Harlem Globetrotters
 Games of the Germany national basketball team
 Games of the Germany men's national handball team
 Home to the PS Karlsruhe Lions basketball team

Address
Europahalle Karlsruhe
Hermann-Veit-Straße 7
D-76135 Karlsruhe

References

External links
 

Indoor arenas in Germany
Basketball venues in Germany
Indoor track and field venues
Buildings and structures in Karlsruhe
Sports venues in Baden-Württemberg